Vidmantas Bačiulis (12 March 1940 – 16 October 2022) was a Lithuanian screenwriter, film and television film director.

Credits

Feature films and TV plays 
He was director of TV renderings of a number of classic Lithuanian works of literature.

Music films
 Dienos, metai – visas gyvenimas, creative portrait of Virgilijus Noreika 
 Kūrybos aukštumos, creative portrait of  Saulius Sondeckis
 Akimirksni žavus, creative portrait of

Documentaries
 1972: Rugsėjo 1-oji
 1972: Ecce Homo
 1974: Prie baltų aukštųjų bokštų
 1997: Čigoniška laimė
 1998: Ateinantys
 1998: Elena keliauja į Lietuvą
 1999: Sveikas, pone Andre
 2000: Kelionė
 2001: Tėvas ir sūnus
 2003: Gyvybės vardan
 2005: Pasivaikščiojimas po Europos parką

References

1940 births
2022 deaths
Lithuanian film directors
Lithuanian screenwriters
Male screenwriters
Lithuanian male writers
People from Panevėžys